Alexander Fehlmann (born 21 June 1977) is a Swiss darts player who plays in Professional Darts Corporation events.

In 2018, he competed in the 2018 PDC World Cup of Darts alongside Andy Bless, where they defeated China in the first round, before losing to the Wales pairing of Gerwyn Price and Jonny Clayton, although Fehlmann defeated Price in the singles.

References

External links

1977 births
Living people
Swiss darts players
Professional Darts Corporation associate players
PDC World Cup of Darts Swiss team
People from Aarau
Sportspeople from Aargau